Walter Flores may refer to:

 Walter Flores (musician), Costa Rican musician
 Wálter Flores (footballer) (born 1978), Bolivian football midfielder
 Walter Vanqquenvaguer Flores (born 1987), Honduran footballer